Alfonso A. Uy 黄祯谭 is a Filipino Chinese businessman that holds numerous businesses in Iloilo. He is the former and first President of the Federation of Filipino Chinese Chambers of Commerce & Industry who came from the Visayas and Mindanao. He finished his Bachelor of Science in Chemical Engineering degree at Central Philippine University. He is also a recipient and awardee of the Dr. Jose Rizal Award for Excellence in Business and Commerce.

See also 

 Emilio Yap

 Edgar Sia

References

21st-century Filipino businesspeople
Central Philippine University alumni
Central Philippine University people
People from Iloilo City
Year of birth missing (living people)
Living people
Filipino people of Chinese descent